Julian Frederick Gordon 'Pye' Hastings (born 21 January 1947 in Tomnavoulin, Banffshire, Scotland) is a British musician. Born in Scotland and raised in Canterbury, Kent, he is the guitarist and vocalist of the Canterbury scene band Caravan and brother of Jimmy Hastings.

In 2017 he successfully funded through a PledgeMusic campaign his first solo album called From the Half House.

Filmography
 2015: Romantic Warriors III: Canterbury Tales (DVD)

References

Canterbury scene
Living people
1947 births
Caravan (band) members
British male guitarists
British rock guitarists
British male singers
Musicians from Kent
Mirage (British band) members
The Wilde Flowers members